Viktoriya Potapova (born 8 January 1974) is a Russian Paralympic judoka. She represented Russia at the Summer Paralympics in 2004, 2008 and 2012. She won a bronze medal on each occasion: in the women's 48 kg event in 2004, in the women's 48 kg event in 2008 and in the women's 48 kg event in 2012. She also represented the Russian Paralympic Committee athletes at the 2020 Summer Paralympics held in Tokyo, Japan and she won one of the bronze medals in the women's 48 kg event.

At the 2015 IBSA European Judo Championships held in Odivelas, Portugal, she won the gold medal in the women's 48 kg event.

Notes

References

External links 
 

Living people
1974 births
Place of birth missing (living people)
Russian female judoka
Judoka at the 2004 Summer Paralympics
Judoka at the 2008 Summer Paralympics
Judoka at the 2012 Summer Paralympics
Judoka at the 2020 Summer Paralympics
Medalists at the 2004 Summer Paralympics
Medalists at the 2008 Summer Paralympics
Medalists at the 2012 Summer Paralympics
Medalists at the 2020 Summer Paralympics
Paralympic bronze medalists for Russia
Paralympic medalists in judo
Paralympic judoka of Russia
Paralympic bronze medalists for the Russian Paralympic Committee athletes
21st-century Russian women